St Margaret's School (Hampstead) is a private girls' school in Hampstead, North London. The school has 150 girls (ages 4 to 16) and 24 teachers. In 2008 and 2009 the school came top of the Sunday Times' Small Independent Schools' league table.

History
There are few written records relating to the history of the school. Because the school was privately owned for the first 70 or so years of its existence, there are practically no official records of its early years and its successive owners were not foresighted enough, or perhaps did not expect the school to have a long future, to preserve the kind of material which might answer questions about that period of its life.

Prologue
St Margaret's is not the oldest school in Hampstead, but it is one of the oldest. Its historical significance, however, is that it is the last remaining "proprietorial" school in the area.  In the second half of the 19th century, there were dozens of such schools, based in ordinary houses in the leafy residential streets of Hampstead.  Most took only a handful of students – both boarding and day – and were owned and presided over by spinster ladies who often had limited qualifications but no other means of providing for themselves.  The vast majority lasted only a decade or two, fading away as their owners retired or died.  Most of those which did manage to survive for longer were forced to close because of dwindling numbers during the turmoil of the World Wars or by the demand for better facilities and more advanced educational methods as the 20th century progressed.  But somehow, very much against the odds, St Margaret's survived. 125 years on, it is now in its fifth home and in the hands of its tenth Principal.

School name
Although the school is celebrating its 125th anniversary, the name "St Margaret’s" is quite a little bit younger. It was normal practice in the 19th century for private schools to have no particular name – they would be referred to by the name of the owners or the houses they occupied.  So our school was probably known as "Miss Tulloch’s" or (possibly) "Chester House".  The first mention of "St Margaret’s" is in 1898, when a newspaper advertisement appeared, announcing that Miss Tulloch would be moving the school to "St Margaret’s, Oak Hill Park".  The name most likely came from the house, which was to become the school's second home, though we know, from the memoirs of Daphne du Maurier, a former pupil, that even in 1915 it was still referred to as "Miss Tulloch’s school". If the name St Margaret's was accidentally given, then it was a most appropriate accident, as St Margaret was a Scottish queen, known for her kindness for children.

The founders
Elizabeth Isabella Tulloch was born in the village of Logierait in Perthshire, Scotland on 9 September 1850, the second child (of 10) of the Revd John Tulloch, a Minister in the Scottish Free Church.   She was almost certainly educated at home, as were most middle class girls at that time.  In her early 20s, she spent some time as a Governess to a family in Tunbridge Wells, but returned to Scotland after the death of her mother in 1873.  We have no way of knowing when or why this Scottish spinster lady decided that it would be a good idea to open a school for girls in Hampstead, but that is what she did, in 1884, in a newly built house called Chester House, on a newly built street called Westcroft Road, in West Hampstead. She didn't embark on this adventure alone, as the 1891 census shows her father and sister living in Chester House with her.

Miss Tulloch was Principal of the school, as well as being its proprietor, for 44 years. In her final year, the Board of Education inspectors described her as "a woman of culture and ideals to whom the School is much indebted for all her educational work".

In 1920, Miss Hilda Jean Copinger had joined the school as Joint Principal, in charge of boarding arrangements and the teaching of domestic science.  On Miss Tulloch's retirement, in 1928, she took over the school, but brought in as her partner and co-principal Miss Margaret Macrae, to oversee the academic side. It appears that the Misses Copinger and Macrae did not exactly hit it off, and the partnership was formally dissolved in 1933.

Miss Copinger was also the daughter of a Vicar, and was born in Brighton in 1879, to The Revd Herbert Copinger and his wife Annie.  Hers was also a large family and one of her brothers, Wilfrid Herbert Copinger was, for a time, vice principal at The Hall School in Hampstead.

The school today
The school has been situated in Kidderpore Gardens in the residential part of Hampstead since 1954. At one point in the intervening years there were 3 boys in the school, but the school has no plans to become co-educational. The school consists of one main building and two outside classrooms.

References

External links
 St Margaret's School official website

Private schools in the London Borough of Camden
Educational institutions established in 1884
1884 establishments in England
Private girls' schools in London
Schools in Hampstead